Gwaelod may refer to:

Cantre'r Gwaelod, legendary ancient sunken kingdom in what is now Cardigan Bay to the west of Wales
Gwaelod-y-Garth (Welsh for Foot of the Garth), village in the parish of Pentyrch, Cardiff in Wales
Llanfihangel-Yn-Y-Gwaelod, village to the west of the city of Cardiff, Wales